The 2014 Asian Airgun Championships were held at Sheikh Sabah Al-Ahmad Olympic Shooting Complex, Kuwait City, Kuwait between March 7 and March 13, 2014.

Medal summary

Men

Women

Medal table

References 
General
 ISSF Results Overview

Specific

External links 
 Official Results

Asian Shooting Championships
Shooting
Asian